Goobo is a town in southern Bay region of Somalia.

References
Goobo

Populated places in Bay, Somalia